Clavus clavata is a species of sea snail, a marine gastropod mollusk in the family Drilliidae.

Description
The elongate, fusiform shell has an acuminate spire. Its color is white with red ribs. The whorls are longitudinally ribbed and spirally striated. The outer lip is strongly produced. The siphonal canal is elongate.

Distribution
This species is found in the demersal zone of the Eastern Pacific Ocean off China.

References

External links
  W.H. Dall (1909),  Report on the collection of shells from Peru ;Proceedings of the United States National Museum, Vol. 37, pages 147–294, with Plates 20–28

clavata
Gastropods described in 1870